Alistair Elder is a former association football player who represented New Zealand at international level.

Elder scored on his full All Whites debut in a 1–1 draw with Fiji on 2 February 1980  and ended his international playing career with five A-international caps and 3 goals to his credit, his final cap an appearance in a 6–1 win over Solomon Islands on 29 February 1980.

References 

Year of birth missing (living people)
Living people
Manurewa AFC players
New Zealand association footballers
New Zealand international footballers
Association football forwards
1980 Oceania Cup players